Chondrostei is a group of non-neopterygian ray-finned fish. While the term originally referred to the paraphyletic grouping of all non-neopterygian ray-finned fish, it was redefined by Patterson in 1982 to be a clade comprising the Acipenseriformes (which includes sturgeon and paddlefish) and their extinct relatives.

Taxa commonly suggested to represent relatives of the Acipenseriformes include the Triassic marine fish Birgeria and the Saurichthyiformes, but their relationship with the Acipenseriformes has been strongly challenged on cladistical grounds. Coccolepididae, a group of small weakly ossified Jurassic and Cretaceous fish found in both marine and freshwater environments, have been suggested to be close relatives of the Acipenseriformes. However, this has never been subject to cladistical analysis.

Classification
Acipenseriformes
Acipenseridae — sturgeons
Polyodontidae — paddlefishes
Chondrosteidae(†)
Errolichthyidae(†)
Cheirolepidiformes(†)
Coccolepididae(†)
Guildayichthyiformes(†)
Luganoiiformes(†)
Palaeonisciformes(†)
Acrolepidae(†)
Birgeriidae(†)
Palaeoniscidae(†)
Perleidiformes(†)
Phanerorhynchiformes(†)
Pholidopleuriformes(†)
Polypteriformes
Polypteridae - bichirs and reedfish
Ptycholepiformes(†)
Saurichthyiformes(†)
Tarrasiiformes(†)

References

 
Extant Silurian first appearances
Paraphyletic groups